Namak Alan (also Romanized as Namak Ālān and Namak Kalān) is a village in Saidabad Rural District, in the Central District of Savojbolagh County, Alborz Province, Iran. At the 2006 census, its population was 273, in 77 families.

References 

Populated places in Savojbolagh County